"Now hear this" is a phrase used, particularly in the United States Navy, to instruct personnel to give "attention to an order or command about to follow".

The phrase was also heard in nautical use in the Star Trek science fiction series. The phrase was used on USS Enterprise (NCC-1701-A) in the film Star Trek VI: The Undiscovered Country, and on USS Enterprise (NCC-1701-D) in the Star Trek:The Next Generation episodes "Encounter at Farpoint" and "Yesterday's Enterprise"and on Starfleet Academy in the video-game Star Trek Online.

This phrase was also used in the Star Wars: Battlefront II video game, for announcements on board Galactic Empire starships.

External links
 "NOW HEAR THIS: NAVY ABANDONS ALL CAPS. Official Communications, Long Written Large, Can Use Mixed Case; No Shouting" Julian E. Barnes The Wall Street Journal, Updated June 13, 2013
 "Now Hear This: Navy Won't Invade Duluth" Associated Press The New York Times, June 8, 1989

References

Nautical terminology
Star Trek sayings